The 1903 Connecticut Aggies football team represented Connecticut Agricultural College, now the University of Connecticut, in the 1903 college football season.  This was the eighth year that the school fielded a football team.  The Aggies were led by second year head coach Edwin O. Smith, and completed the season with a record of 3–5.

Schedule

References

Connecticut
UConn Huskies football seasons
Connecticut Aggies football